Fishes with a common name of silver fish or silverfish may include:

 Aphareus rutilans
 Argentina sphyraena
 Argyrozona argyrozona
 Labeobarbus bynni
 Enteromius mattozi
 Callorhinchus milii
 Elops saurus
 Leptatherina presbyteroides
 Megalops atlanticus
 Pseudocaranx dentex
 Raiamas senegalensis
 Steindachnerina argentea
 Trachinotus ovatus
 Trichiurus lepturus
 Ulaema lefroyi
 Antarctic silverfish (Pleuragramma antarcticum)
 A Chinese-to-English translation of whitebait
 Members of the family Salangidae ("dulong" in the Tagalog language).

Fish common names